A barrel of land (Danish: tønde land, Norwegian: tønneland, Swedish: tunnland, Finnish: tynnyrinala) is a Scandinavian unit of area. The word may originate from the area of fields one could seed with a barrel of grain seeds. The acre is the equivalent Anglo-Saxon unit. Because the barrel sizes varied by country, the area unit does too. One barrel can be approximated as half a hectare.

Per country

Denmark
In Denmark the tønde was used as an official area unit until the introduction of the metric system in 1907. A tønde was divided in 8 skæpper. A skæppe was divided into 4 fjerdingkar and a fjerdingkar into 3 album.

Norway
A tønneland was divided in 4 mål. Nowadays a mål corresponds to 1,000 square meters in everyday speech.

Sweden
The unit was officially surveyed and standardized in the 1630s, and set to 14,000 Swedish square ells, i.e. 56,000 Swedish square feet. One tunnland was divided into 56 kannland, 32 kappland, 6 skäppland or 2 lopsland.

Finland
In Finland the Swedish units that were officially defined in the 1630s were used, but with Finnish names: one tynnyrinala (tunnland) corresponding to 32 kapanala (kappland) or 2 panninala (lopsland).

In modern units
 Danish tønde land: 
 Norwegian tønneland: 
 Swedish tunnland: 
 Finnish tynnyrinala:

See also
 Norwegian units of measurement
 Danish units of measurement
 Swedish units of measurement
 Finnish units of measurement

References

Customary units of measurement
Units of area